Narayanganj Bar Academy is a Bangladeshi all-boys public school located in Narayanganj Sadar Upazila, Bangladesh, primarily for the primary, lower-secondary, and secondary level education for the children of Narayanganj Bar Council members stationed in Narayanganj Sadar; and some pupils come from the civilian sector. The institution is under the supervision of the Narayanganj Bar Council.

The school offers education for students (boys) ranging from first grade to tenth grade (approximately ages 6 to 16). With over 1,700 students, Narayanganj High School is one of the largest schools in the Narayanganj city.

Campus
The campus is located in the heart of Narayanganj, adjacent to the 300-bed medical hospital, just opposite the Narayanganj B.R.T.A. (Bangladesh Road and Transport Authority) office. The campus consists of dormitories, staff quarters, an auditorium, an administrative building, and a full-size football field.

Academics
The college offers primary education along with secondary education (Secondary School Certificate) for both boys.

Curriculum
The curriculum of Narayanganj Bar Academy includes traditional primary and secondary level academic subjects from the grade 1st to 5th and 6th to 10th respectively. The curriculum for secondary level academic subjects is introduced by the Board of Intermediate and Secondary Education, Dhaka. Students of primary classes take academic core subjects including Bengali, English, mathematics, social science, general science, arts and crafts, religion and physical science. Students of the secondary level have to elect one of the three major programs: Arts and Humanities; Commerce; and Science. Students have some compulsory subjects and some optional subjects in each of the programs.

Extra-curriculum activities
Students of the school take part in various activities. Such as-Debate, Sports, Quiz, Religious activities, Annual cultural program's etc.

Alumni Association
Narayanganj Bar Academy Alumni Association

References

External links
 Community Page

Educational institutions established in 1906
High schools in Bangladesh
1906 establishments in India
Education in Narayanganj